Venantius (floruit 507) was a Roman politician and consul for the year 507 with Emperor Anastasius I as his colleague.

Venantius was the son of Petrus Marcellinus Felix Liberius. James O'Donnel notes that the "only known relative in the aristocracy" of Liberius – except for Venantius – was Avienus, consul of 501.

References 

People of the Ostrogothic Kingdom
6th-century Roman consuls
Imperial Roman consuls
6th-century Italo-Roman people